The following is a list of figure skaters.

A

B

C

D

E

F

G

H

I

J

K

L

M

N

O

P

Q

R

S

T

U

V

W

X

Y

Z

See also
 List of Olympic medalists in figure skating
 List of Olympic medalists in figure skating by age

References
List of International Skating Union figure skating biographical profiles

 
Figure skaters
Figure skaters